The Remix Wars: Strike 2 is remix album of Canadian industrial band Front Line Assembly and German industrial band Die Krupps, released in 1996. It is subtitled "Front Line Assembly vs. Die Krupps". It is the second in a series of four remix albums on which two bands remix each other's tracks. The liner notes of the album describes the concept: "Two different groups or projects fight each other using samplers, mixing consoles and creativity as their weapons." The first three tracks are from III - Odyssey of the Mind, the other tracks are from Hard Wired. On the occasion of the 20th anniversary of the launch of the remix series in 2016 Canadian label Artoffact re-released the albums on vinyl.

Track listing

Personnel
 Bill Leeb – programming (4–6), remixing (1–3)
 Rhys Fulber – programming (4–6), remixing (1–3)
 Greg Reely – engineering, mixing (4–6)
 Jürgen Engler – guitar (4–6), keyboard (4–6), remixing (4–6)
 Chris Lietz – drum programming (4–6), engineering (4–6), remixing (4–6)

References

Front Line Assembly albums
Die Krupps albums
1996 remix albums
Industrial remix albums